This article pertains to the awards, nominations and honors given to the ABC dramedy series Ugly Betty. The series so far has been nominated for 160 awards and won 60 of them, including 3 Emmys, 2 Golden Globes, 2 GLAADs, 5 NAACP Image, 8 ALMAs and 3 Satellite Awards. Of most of these achievements, America Ferrera has won an Emmy, a Golden Globe, a NAACP Image, a SAG, 2 ALMAs (one of them for Entertainer of the Year in 2008), and a Teen Choice breakout award. It has also been honored with a Peobody Award and was recognized by the United States Congress. In addition, Ferrera was chosen by Time magazine as one of their 100 most influential people in 2007, due to the portrayal of the series' main character, Betty Suarez.

ALMA Awards
The ALMA Awards honors the Hispanic entertainment community. During its first season, Ugly Betty won four of its first seven nominations and in the second season took home three more, along with a Chevrolet Entertainer of the Year Award for Ferrera for her work on the show. Overall the series has received eleven nominations.

Directors Guild of America Awards

Emmy Awards
In its ongoing run, Ugly Betty has been nominated for twenty Emmy Awards. In 2007, it won three awards including the Primetime Emmy Award for Outstanding Casting in a Comedy Series and a best Actress in a Comedy series for America Ferrera. The series was also nominated in the category for Outstanding Comedy Series, alongside Entourage, The Office, Two and a Half Men and 30 Rock, the latter having won the honor. In addition series creator Salma Hayek and Judith Light competed for the Best Guest Starring Actress in a Comedy award but both lost to 30 Rock's Elaine Stritch at that year's awards ceremony for her portrayal of Colleen Donaghy in the season one finale, "Hiatus."

Primetime Emmy Awards

Creative Arts Emmy Awards

Golden Globe Awards
Ugly Betty has been nominated for four awards and won two Golden Globes so far in its run. The first two awards were both won by America Ferrera for Best Actress and for the series itself in 2007.

GLAAD Media Awards
The Series has won two consecutive GLAAD Media Awards for its portrayal of its LGBT characters and their storylines, as played by actors Michael Urie and Rebecca Romijn.

Imagen Foundation Awards

NAACP Image Awards
Although The NAACP Image Awards honors African americans in the entertainment industry, the series has won five of the Image Awards' eight major TV categories, a rarity among television series with a multicultural cast. In addition to winning an Image award for the TV series in 2007 and Ferrera for best actress in 2008, Vanessa Williams has won back to back honors (in 2007 and 2008) in the Supporting Actress category for her portrayal of Wilhelmina Slater.

Satellite Awards

Screen Actors Guild Awards

Teen Choice Awards

Television Critics Association Awards

Writers Guild of America Awards

Other awards
In addition to the major awards listed above, the series has also been recognized in the awards listed below:

Season one (2006–2007)

Season two (2007–2008)

Season three (2008–2009)

Season four (2009–2010)

Peabody Award
On June 4, 2007, the series was honored with a Peabody Award for its storylines, which explores clashing concepts of beauty, class, race and footwear with intelligence, warmth and wit.

Other accolades

The show's impact on issues and culture has also attracted the attention of the United States Congress, where on January 17, 2007 California congresswoman Hilda Solis (D-32nd, El Monte) saluted Ferrera on both her Golden Globe win and for bringing a positive profile to the Latin and Hispanic communities.
 On May 8, 2007, star America Ferrera was honored by Time Magazine on their annual list of the 100 most influential people. The event took place at New York's Lincoln Center and the actress was recognized for defying stereotypes with the show .

References

Ugly Betty
Ugly Betty